Maria Theresa Short (died 15 January 1869) was a Scottish  entrepreneur who increased public access to scientific equipment in Edinburgh in the 19th century. She was born and died in Edinburgh.

The Short Family 

In the early 18th century, the Short family were scientific instrument makers in Edinburgh's Southside. In 1776, their son, Thomas Short leased some land on Calton Hill and built a Gothic House to display his instruments to the public. 

As a condition of his lease, the local council demanded that female relatives of Thomas could not inherit the building and its contents. When he died in 1788, his wife and children did not inherit it.

Short’s Observatory – Calton Hill 

In 1827, Maria Theresa Short returned from the West Indies claiming to be Thomas Short's daughter. She claimed his Great Telescope, which was housed in the City Chambers, for her inheritance. 

She set up a Popular Observatory, which she opened in a wooden hut next to the Nelson Monument on Calton Hill. After continuous disagreements with the local council, the Lord Provost called for the observatory to be pulled down. Despite her protests, this was done in 1851.

Short’s Observatory – Castlehill 

On 26 April 1843, Maria married Robert Henderson, at Saint Cuthbert's, Edinburgh, and in 1852 bought the Laird of Cockpen's townhouse on Castlehill, now known as Old Town, Edinburgh. With the help of sponsors she added an extra two floors and a viewing platform with a dome housing a camera obscura. The building is nowadays known as the Outlook Tower. 

In the 1861 census, she and her husband were recorded as living in the tower. She was noted as being 58 years old, but if she had really been the daughter of Thomas Short she would have needed to be 82. Therefore, it seems unlikely that she was actually his daughter. 

In 1869, she died, "aged about 70" (likely inaccurate) in the Outlook Tower. Her widower continued to run the attraction until it was taken over by Patrick Geddes in 1892.

See also
 Patrick Geddes
 Outlook Tower

References

Sources
 Brück, Mary, Women in Early British and Irish Astronomy: Stars and Satellites, Springer, 2009, pp 20–22
 Gilbert W M, Edinburgh in the 19th Century, J and R Allan, 1901
 Wallace, Veronica. “Maria Obscura”, Edinburgh Review 88 (1992): 101–109.

External links
 The Astronomical Society of Edinburgh: A Guide to Edinburgh's Popular Observatory 
 Brück, Mary, "Not just computers and companions" Astronomy & Geophysics, Volume 50, Issue 4, August 2009, Page 4.38
 Camera Obscura & World of Illusions - Our Story

1869 deaths
19th-century Scottish women
Scottish women in business
History of Edinburgh
Year of birth unknown